The Stephenson House was built in 1887 in Oakman, Alabama. The Eastlake style house is one of the oldest houses in town, built for Dr. Hugh Watson Stephenson using purchased stock plans. Stephenson was a prominent local physician and state legislator. The house retains its period detailing and intricate carving.

The -story house features elaborate scrollwork on the gables and the front porch. A turret rises from a low dormer over the front door. The house was placed on the National Register of Historic Places on September 18, 1978.

References

External links
 

Houses on the National Register of Historic Places in Alabama
Queen Anne architecture in Alabama
Walker County, Alabama
Historic American Buildings Survey in Alabama
National Register of Historic Places in Walker County, Alabama
Houses completed in 1887